Stura Vallis is an ancient river valley in the Elysium quadrangle of Mars, located at 22.9° north latitude and 217.6° west longitude.  It is 75 km long and was named after a classical river east of Rome, Italy.

References

Valleys and canyons on Mars
Elysium quadrangle